Beeke or Beekes may refer to:

People
Henry Beeke (1751–1837), English historian, theologian, and writer
Joel Beeke (born 1952), U.S. Christian pastor and theologian
Robert S. P. Beekes (1937–2017), Dutch linguist

German rivers
Bramstedter Beeke of Lower Saxony
Eschenhäuser Beeke of Lower Saxony
Heiligenloher Beeke of Lower Saxony
Mützelburger Beeke of Mecklenburg-Vorpommern
Nienstedter Beeke of Lower Saxony
Schorlingborsteler Beeke of Lower Saxony

Other
Beeke language, a Bantu language